is a cross country skier from Japan. He competed for Japan at the 2014 Winter Olympics in the cross country skiing events.

References

1990 births
Living people
Olympic cross-country skiers of Japan
Cross-country skiers at the 2014 Winter Olympics
Cross-country skiers at the 2017 Asian Winter Games
Medalists at the 2017 Asian Winter Games
Asian Games gold medalists for Japan
Asian Games bronze medalists for Japan
Asian Games medalists in cross-country skiing
Japanese people of New Zealand descent
Japanese male cross-country skiers
Universiade medalists in cross-country skiing
Universiade silver medalists for Japan
Competitors at the 2011 Winter Universiade
21st-century Japanese people